Krępa  is a district of the city of Zielona Góra, in western Poland, located in the northern part of the city. It was a separate village until 2014.

Krępa has a population of 671.

Notable people
 Andrzej Huszcza (born 1957), Polish retired speedway rider

References

Neighbourhoods in Poland
Zielona Góra